Dutch Island may refer to a location in the United States:

Dutch Island, Georgia, a census-designated place
Dutch Island (Rhode Island), an island in Narragansett Bay
Dutch Island Light